Rudnica  is a village in the administrative district of Gmina Wałcz, within Wałcz County, West Pomeranian Voivodeship, in north-western Poland.
Main tourist attraction within Rudnica is Rudnica Park Linowy (Rudnica Ropes Course), second largest of its type in Poland.

References

Rudnica